Nucleosome assembly protein 1 like 3 is a protein that in humans is encoded by the NAP1L3 gene.

Function

This gene is intronless and encodes a member of the nucleosome assembly protein (NAP) family. This gene is linked closely to a region of genes responsible for several X-linked cognitive disability syndromes. [provided by RefSeq, Dec 2010].

References

Further reading